Hương Gián is a commune (xã) and village in Yên Dũng District, Bắc Giang Province, in northeastern Vietnam. The commune covers an area of 8.57 km2.

References

Populated places in Bắc Giang province
Communes of Bắc Giang province